HHMS may refer to:

 Massawa International Airport, in Eretrea
 His Hawaiian Majesty's Ship, a ship designation; see Kaimiloa, the only ship ever so designated
 His Hellenic Majesty's Ship, a ship designation; see Hellenic Navy